These are the official results of the Men's 4 × 100 metre relay event at the 1980 Summer Olympics in Moscow, USSR. There were a total number of 16 nations competing. The top three in each heat and next two fastest advanced to the final.

Final
The final was held on Friday 1 August 1980, at the Lenin Stadium

Heats
There were two heats which took place on 31 July 1980 at the Lenin Stadium. The first three in each heat and fastest two others advanced to the final.

See also
 1976 Men's Olympic Games 4 × 100 m Relay (Montreal)
 1978 Men's European Championships 4 × 100 m Relay (Prague)
 1982 Men's European Championships 4 × 100 m Relay (Athens)
 1983 Men's World Championships 4 × 100 m Relay (Helsinki)
 1984 Men's Olympic Games 4 × 100 m Relay (Los Angeles)

References

External links
 Results

R
Relay foot races at the Olympics
Men's events at the 1980 Summer Olympics